Glenn Robinson (born 1973) is an American former basketball player.

Glenn Robinson may also refer to:
 Glenn Robinson (coach) (born 1944), American college basketball coach
 Glenn Robinson (American football) (born 1951), American football player
 Glenn Robinson III (born 1994), American professional basketball player

See also
Glen Robinson (disambiguation)